David Armstrong (born 2 July 1964) is a British bobsledder. He competed at the 1988 Winter Olympics and the 1992 Winter Olympics.

References

External links
 

1964 births
Living people
British male bobsledders
Olympic bobsledders of Great Britain
Bobsledders at the 1988 Winter Olympics
Bobsledders at the 1992 Winter Olympics
Sportspeople from Portsmouth